Karl-Heinz Radschinsky (born 23 July 1953) is a retired German weightlifter. He won the gold medal in the middleweight class at the 1984 Summer Olympics in Los Angeles.

References

1953 births
Living people
People from Neumarkt in der Oberpfalz
Sportspeople from the Upper Palatinate
German male weightlifters
Weightlifters at the 1984 Summer Olympics
Olympic weightlifters of West Germany
Olympic gold medalists for West Germany
Olympic medalists in weightlifting
Medalists at the 1984 Summer Olympics